Fernando Aguilar Camacho (14 February 1938 – 20 June 2013) was a Spanish long-distance runner. He competed in the men's 5000 metres at the 1964 Summer Olympics.

References

External links

1938 births
2013 deaths
Athletes (track and field) at the 1964 Summer Olympics
Spanish male long-distance runners
Olympic athletes of Spain
Mediterranean Games bronze medalists for Spain
Mediterranean Games medalists in athletics
Athletes (track and field) at the 1963 Mediterranean Games